The tenth season of The Real Housewives of New York City, an American reality television series, is broadcast on Bravo. It premiered on April 4, 2018, and concluded on September 5, 2018. The series is primarily filmed in New York City. Its executive producers are Andrew Hoegl, Barrie Bernstein, Lisa Shannon, Pam Healy and Andy Cohen. The season focuses on the lives of Bethenny Frankel, Luann de Lesseps, Ramona Singer, Sonja Morgan, Carole Radziwill, Dorinda Medley and Tinsley Mortimer.

This season marked the final appearance of Carole Radziwill.

Cast and synopsis
For the tenth season, all seven of the housewives from the conclusion of the ninth season returned, making it the first time in the show's history the cast was unchanged between seasons.  In addition, former housewives Heather Thompson and Jill Zarin made guest appearances during the season. On July 25, 2018, Carole Radziwill announced that the tenth season would be her last, following her decision to depart the show. In a statement to E! Online, she said: "After six seasons on Bravo's RHONYC, I have decided to return to what I do best — journalism and producing. I am sure this does not come as a surprise to any of the viewers, all of whom have been supportive, encouraging, and kind."

 de Lesseps does not appear at this reunion.

Episodes

References

External links

 

2018 American television seasons
New York City (season 10)